Edward J. Orlett is an American politician and former Democrat member of the Ohio House of Representatives.

References

External links
Stop the Drug War- Ed Orlett

Republican Party members of the Ohio House of Representatives
Living people
1933 births